Frank Arrigo (1917–1977) was an American art director. He worked on more than a hundred and fifty films and television series during his career. From 1959 to 1971 he also directed episodes of several television series.

Selected filmography
 Will Tomorrow Ever Come? (1947)
 Rustlers of Devil's Canyon (1947)
 Renegades of Sonora (1948)
 Heart of Virginia (1948)
 Duke of Chicago (1949)
 Sheriff of Wichita (1949)
 Rustlers on Horseback (1950)
 Under Mexicali Stars (1950)
 Gunmen of Abilene (1950)
 Desert of Lost Men (1951)
 Buckaroo Sheriff of Texas  (1951)
 Captive of Billy the Kid (1952)
 Lady Possessed (1952)
 Savage Frontier (1953)
 Fair Wind to Java (1953)
 Iron Mountain Trail (1953)
 Down Laredo Way (1953)
 Sea of Lost Ships (1953)
 Phantom Stallion (1954)
 Jubilee Trail (1954)
 Untamed Heiress (1954)
 The Fighting Chance (1955)
 Come Next Spring (1956)
 Lisbon (1956)
 Hell's Crossroads  (1957)
 Duel at Apache Wells (1957)
 Affair in Reno (1957)

References

Bibliography
 Pitts, Michael R. Western Movies: A Guide to 5,105 Feature Films. McFarland, 2012.

External links

1917 births
1977 deaths
American art directors